Arnaud Bovolenta (born 6 September 1988) is a French freestyle skier. He was born in Albertville. He competed in ski cross at the World Ski Championships 2011 and at the 2014 Winter Olympics in Sochi, where he took the silver medal. He took his first podium in the FIS Freestyle Skiing World Cup in December 2016, when he finished third in the sixth round of the 2016-17 season in Innichen.

References

External links

1988 births
Living people
Freestyle skiers at the 2014 Winter Olympics
Freestyle skiers at the 2018 Winter Olympics
French male freestyle skiers
Olympic freestyle skiers of France
Olympic silver medalists for France
Olympic medalists in freestyle skiing
Medalists at the 2014 Winter Olympics
Sportspeople from Albertville
21st-century French people